There are more than 342 bridges in the city limits of Saint Petersburg, Russia. This is a partial list of the most famous ones.

Peter the Great was designing the city as another Amsterdam and Venice, with canals instead of streets and citizens skillful in sailing. Initially, there were only about ten bridges constructed in the city, mainly across ditches and minor creeks. By Peter's plans, in the summer months, the citizens were supposed to move around in boats, and in the winter months when the water froze to move in sledges. However, after Peter's death, new bridges were built, as it was a much easier way of transportation. Temporary ponton bridges were used in the summertime. The first permanent bridge of bricks and stones across the main branch of the Neva river appeared in 1850.

Today, there are more 342 bridges over canals and rivers of various sizes, styles and constructions, built at different periods. Some of them are small pedestrian bridges, such as Bank and Lion bridges, others are huge transport arteries such as almost one kilometer long Alexander Nevsky Bridge. There are about 800 small bridges across hundreds of smaller ponds and lakes in public parks and gardens, and over 100 bridges in various ports, marinas, yacht clubs and private industries. The total number of bridges in Saint Petersburg is over a thousand. The nearly 100-meter-wide Blue Bridge, claimed to be the widest in the world, spans the Moyka River. There are bridges designed in various styles with such decorations as statues, lamplights, lions, horses, sphinxes and griffins, and there are modern styles lacking any decor. Thanks to the intricate web of canals, Saint Petersburg is often called the "Venice of the North" which is a popular poetic name for the northern capital.

The names of the bridges are of a great diversity as well. Some take their names from geographic locations — such as English, Italian and Egyptian bridges. Other names refer to the places such as Postoffice, Theater and Bank bridges. Many bridges are named after famous people - Alexander Nevsky, Peter the Great, Lomonosov bridges. There are "colored" bridges — Red, Green, Blue and Yellow bridges.

A familiar view of Saint Petersburg is a drawbridge across the Neva. Every night during the navigation period from April to November, 22 bridges across Neva and main canals are drawn to let ships pass in and out of the Baltic Sea into the Volga-Baltic waterway system. A calculated schedule with precise time of consecutive opening and closing for each bridge is maintained to guarantee passage of cargo ships and tankers at a precisely controlled speed, in order to have at least one bridge at a time staying connected to ensure passage for firefighters, police, ambulances and other ground transportation.

Facts by numbers 
 There are 342 bridges inside the city limits, 5 in Kronstadt, 54 in Tsarskoye Selo, 51 in Petergof, 16 in Pavlovsk and 7 in Oranienbaum. 
 The total length of all the city bridges is approximately 
 22 are drawbridges
 The longest bridge is Big Obukhovsky Bridge across Neva River

Bridges across Neva River and Great Neva 

Bridges are numbered downstream, with initials to determine which distributary they cross.

Bridges across the Griboyedov Canal 

 Theater Bridge
 Novo-Konyushenny Bridge
 Italian Bridge
 Kazansky Bridge
 Bank Bridge
 Flour Bridge
 Stone Bridge
 Demidov Bridge
 Hay Bridge
 Kokushkin Bridge
 Voznesensky Bridge
 Podyachensky Bridge
 Bridge of Four Lions
 Kharlamov Bridge
 Novo-Nikolsky Bridge
 Krasnogvardeysky Bridge
 Pikalov Bridge
 Mogilyovsky Bridge
 Alarchin Bridge
 Kolomensky Bridge
 Malo-Kalinkin Bridge

Bridges across Fontanka River 

 Prachechny Bridge
 Panteleymonovsky Bridge
 Belinsky Bridge
 Anichkov Bridge
 Lomonosov Bridge
 Letushkov Bridge
 Semenovsky Bridge
 Gorstkin Bridge
 Obukhovsky Bridge
 Izmailovsky Bridge
 Krasnoarmeysky Bridge
 Egyptian Bridge
 English Bridge
 Staro-Kalinkin Bridge
 Galerny Bridge

Bridges across Moyka River 

 First Engineer Bridge
 First Sadovy Bridge
 Second Sadovy Bridge
 Malo-Konyushenny Bridge
 Bolshoy Konyushenny Bridge
 Pevchesky Bridge
 Green Bridge
 Red Bridge
 Blue Bridge
 Fonarny Bridge
 Pochtamtsky Bridge
 Potseluev Bridge
 Krasnoflotsky Bridge
 Hrapovitsky Bridge
 Korabelny Bridge

Bridges across Winter Canal 
 Hermitage Bridge
 First Winter Bridge
 Second Winter Bridge

Bridges across the Kryukov Canal 
 Smezhny Bridge
 Staro-Nikolsky Bridge
 Kashin Bridge
 Torgovy Bridge
 Dekabristov Bridge
 Matveevsky Bridge

Bridges across the Obvodnyi Canal 

 Shlisserburg Bridge
 Atamansky Bridge
 Nikolaevsky railway Bridge
 Predtechny Bridge
 Novo-kamenniy bridge
 Borovoy Bridge
 Ippodromny Bridge
 Tsarskoselsky railway Bridge
 Ruzovsky Bridge
 Mozhaysky Bridge
 Gazovy Bridge
 Maslyny Bridge
 Novo-Moskovky Bridge
 Warsaw Bridge
 Baltic Bridge
 Novo-Peterofsky Bridge
 Krasnooktyabrsky Bridge
 Tarakanovsky Bridge
 Borisov Bridge
 Novo-Kalinkin Bridge
 Stepan Razin Bridge

Bridges across the Okhta River 
 Armashevsky Bridge
 Bolshoy Ilinsky Bridge
 Industrial Bridge
 Irinovsky Bridge
 Komarovsky Bridga
 Malookhtinsky Bridge
 Obyezdnoy Bridge
 Utkin Bridge
 Shaumyana Bridge

Bridges across Okkervil River 
 Utkin Bridge
 Zanevsky Bridge
 Yablonovsky Bridge
 Rossijsky Bridge
 Kollontay Bridge
 Podvoisky Bridge
 Tovarischesky Bridge
 Dybenko Bridge

Bridges across Smolenka River 
 Uralsky Bridge
 Smolensky Bridge
 Nalichny Bridge
 Shipbuilders' Bridge

Bridges across the Swan Canal 
 Upper Swan Bridge
 Lower Swan Bridge

Image gallery

See also 
Except bridges, in Saint Petersburg there are other kinds of crossings:
Tunnels
 Orlovsky tunnel
 Kanonersky tunnel
Ferries
 Railway ferry line

References

External links
 Bridges night timetable for Android

Saint Petersburg, Russia

Bridges
Bridges, Saint Petersburg

de:Brücken in Sankt Petersburg